ABCA may refer to:

 American Baseball Coaches Association, an organization for baseball coaches
 ABCA Armies, an international military organization
 Army Bureau of Current Affairs, an organisation set up to educate and raise morale amongst British servicemen in World War II
 West Virginia Alcohol Beverage Control Administration, the alcoholic beverage control authority in the U.S. state of West Virginia
 Court of Appeal of Alberta
 Ausable Bayfield Conservation Authority